The name Ismarus may refer to:

 Ismarus (Thrace), a city of the Cicones, on the Aegean coast of Thrace, mentioned in the Odyssey
 A mountain of the same name, "Ismaros"; see Ismarus (Thrace)
 Ismarus (wasp), a genus of wasps

Mythology
 Ismarus, defender of Thebes who killed Hippomedon
 Ismarus (Immaradus), son of Eumolpus and son-in-law of the Thracian king Tegyrios